Borg El Arab Technological University is a national, non-profit Egyptian university, one of the technological universities that are established in accordance with Law No. 72 of 2019 which organize the establishment of technological universities in Egypt, which are educational institutions that follow the method of education and training for students in various specialties needed by the labor market while developing and building the skills necessary to enroll graduates in the labor market directly. The university is located in the universities district in New Borg El Arab city in Alexandria Governorate, on an area of 42 thousand square meters.

The university campus includes the educational building and has classrooms of different sizes, a cafeteria, workshops and laboratories building, an administrative building, a library, playgrounds, and a parking lot. The duration of study at the university is four years, and the university, like other technological universities, grants degrees according to specialization, which are the above-average professional diploma in technology, the professional bachelor's in technology, the professional master's in technology, and the professional doctorate in technology. The study at the university was started in September 2022.

Objectives 
In accordance with Law No. 72 of 2019 Technological Universities were established to achieve several goals, the most important of which are:
 Creating a new integrated path for applied and technological education and training parallel to the academic education path.
 Apply technology and exploit it for the benefit of society and qualify graduates to meet the needs of the labor market.
 Providing technological education that provides high educational quality and training services.
 Continuous development of curricula and study plans for all grades and levels.
 Providing technical assistance and administrative advice in the field of technical education and training.

Academic programs 

The university includes many academic programs, including:
 Technology of operation and maintenance of textile manufacturing.
 Technology of tractors and agricultural machinery.
 Technology of the food industry.
 Rail transport technology.
 health specialties.

See also 
 Egypt-Japan University of Science and Technology.
 International Branch of Alexandria University.
 City of Scientific Research and Technological Applications.

References 

Universities in Egypt
New Borg El Arab